Heiko Vogel (born 21 November 1975) is a German football manager who is the current sporting director and interim coach of FC Basel.

Vogel grew up in Wachenheim and played football for his local clubs TuS Wachenheim and FC 08 Hassloch. Later he played for SV Edenkoben.

Coaching career

Bayern Munich and Ingolstadt
He did his apprenticeship and became a sports teacher. Between 1998 and 2007, he worked within the youth system of FC Bayern Munich as coach. From 2007 until 2009, he worked as assistant to Thorsten Fink at FC Ingolstadt 04.

FC Basel
On 9 June 2009, Fink was appointed as the new manager of FC Basel and Vogel followed as assistant straight away. Under Fink and Vogel Basel won the Swiss Cup 2010 and the national Championship in 2010 and 2011.

On 13 October 2011, Fink left the club to join Hamburger SV and on the same day Vogel was appointed as caretaker Manager. Vogel's first three games in charge of the team were the Swiss Cup fixture on 15 October, which ended in a 5–1 away win against FC Schötz, the Champions League Group C fixture on 18 October 2011, a 0–2 home defeat against Benfica, and the 1–0 away win in the Super League against FC Zürich. On 7 December 2011 he guided FC Basel to the round of 16 in the UEFA Champions League, defeating the 2011 runners up Manchester United by 2–1. After 11 games, four of which in the Champions League, with eight wins, two draws and only one defeat, it was announced on 12 December that Vogel had signed as head coach and manager. Basel won the league championship and the Swiss Cup during the 2011–12 season. On 15 October 2012, Vogel was sacked by the club and was replaced by Murat Yakin. His final match was a 3–2 win against Servette. Basel were in fourth place when Vogel left the club.

Return to Bayern Munich
He returned to coach in the Bayern Munich Junior Team before being appointed to Bayern Munich II. He replaced Erik ten Hag who became the sporting director and head coach of FC Utrecht. The first training as the reserve team head coach happened on 11 June 2015. His first match was 1–1 draw against FV Illertissen on 29 July 2015. Bayern II finished the 2015–16 season in sixth place. On 22 February 2017, it was announced that Vogel will be leaving the reserve team at the end of the season by mutual consent. Vogel resigned on 21 March 2017. His final match was a 2–1 loss to 1860 Rosenheim.

Sturm Graz
In December 2017, Sturm Graz presented Heiko Vogel as the new head coach. He was the successor of Franco Foda, who left the club to coach Austrias national team. Vogel started his new position on 1 January 2018. His first match as head coach was a 1–0 loss against Mattersburg on 3 February 2018. He started the 2018–19 season with a 2–0 win in the Austrian Cup against Siegendorf. Sturm Graz were knocked out of Champions League in the second qualifying round by Ajax and entered the Europa League. Sturm Graz were eliminated from the Europa League by AEK Larnaca.

KFC Uerdingen
On 27 April 2019, he was appointed as the new head coach of KFC Uerdingen. He was terminated on 25 September 2019.

Borussia Mönchengladbach II
On 26 May 2020, he became the coach of the Borussia Mönchengladbach II, the U23 of Mönchengladbach, who play in the Regionalliga West. On 18 May 2021, his departure following the conclusion of the season was announced.

Return to FC Basel
	
On 28 November 2022, he was announced as the new sporting director of his former club FC Basel in the Swiss Super League, per 1 January 2023. A little over a month later he once again took up coaching in the interim for Basel, after coach Alex Frei was terminated on 7 February 2023.

Coaching record

Honours
Basel
 Swiss Super League: 2011–12
 Swiss Cup: 2011–12
Sturm Graz

 Austrian Cup: 2017–18

KFC Uerdingen

 Lower Rhine Cup: 2018–19

Personal

 Swiss Manager of the Year: 2012
 Axpo Super League Fairplay Award: 2012

References

External links

Profile at FC Basel 
Profile at Swiss Football League 

1975 births
Living people
People from Bad Dürkheim
Footballers from Rhineland-Palatinate
German football managers
FC Basel managers
FC Bayern Munich non-playing staff
FC Bayern Munich II managers
German footballers
Association football midfielders
KFC Uerdingen 05 managers
3. Liga managers
German expatriate football managers
Expatriate football managers in Switzerland
German expatriate sportspeople in Switzerland